Kessleria albescens is a moth of the family Yponomeutidae. It is found in France, Italy and Austria.

The length of the forewings is 6–7.3 mm for males and 5.1–6.1 mm for females. The forewings are white with light and dark brown scales. The hindwings are light brown. Adults are on wing from July to September.

The larvae feed on Saxifraga paniculata. Young larvae mine the leaves of their host plant. When older, they feed freely from within a spinning.

References

Moths described in 1899
Yponomeutidae
Moths of Europe